Chen Fan (90s- 25 October 168), courtesy name Zhongju, was a Chinese politician of the Eastern Han dynasty. A native of Pingyu, Runan (north of present-day Pingyu County, Henan), Chen served as Grand Commandant during the reign of Emperor Huan and later as Grand Tutor in Emperor Ling's time. He and Dou Wu plotted against the eunuchs, but their plan was leaked; they were then both killed.

Service under Emperor Huan
In the 160s, when a teenage Xu Shao went to Yingchuan Commandery (潁川郡; covering present-day southern and central Henan), he visited and mingled with many reputable men in the region, except for Chen Shi. Later, when Chen Fan's wife died, many people attended her funeral, but Xu Shao did not show up. When asked, Xu Shao replied, "Taiqiu is too well-acquainted, it's difficult for him to be thorough; Zhongju is a serious person who hardly makes compromises. These are the reasons why I didn't visit them."

In July or August 165, Chen Fan was appointed Grand Commandant, replacing Yang Bing. He remained Grand Commandant until August 166; Emperor Huan found Chen's advice too uncomfortable so he relieved Chen of his position, citing that the officials Chen recommended were unsuitable for their positions.

Service under Emperor Ling

See also
 Dou Wu

References

168 deaths
Executed Han dynasty people
Executed people from Henan
Han dynasty politicians from Henan
People executed by the Han dynasty
Politicians from Zhumadian
Year of birth unknown